Last Tango in Halifax is a British drama series that began broadcasting on BBC One on 20 November 2012. The first series of Last Tango In Halifax aired between 20 November and 19 December 2012. It was the UK's highest rated new mid-week television drama of 2012 and was re-commissioned for a second series. The second series aired from 19 November 2013 to 24 December 2013. The series was re-commissioned for a third series on 24 December 2013, ahead of the final episode of the second series. The third series aired from 28 December 2014 to 1 February 2015. Following the end of the final episode of series three, the BBC announced that a fourth series had been commissioned. The fourth series was broadcast on 19 and 20 December 2016 and a fifth series in February and March 2020.

Episodes
Series 1 (2012)

Series 2 (2013)

Series 3 (2014–2015)

Series 4 (2016)
Series Four consists of two episodes featured as Christmas Specials.

Series 5 (2020)

References

External links
Last Tango in Halifax BBC Episode Guide

 Last Tango in Halifax on PBS

Lists of British drama television series episodes
Works by Sally Wainwright